Karl Sharif Dargan (born June 17, 1985) is an American boxer. Nicknamed "The Dynamite", Dargan is best known for winning the gold medal at the 2007 Pan Am Games in the Men's Light Welterweight.

Career

Amateur
Dargan began boxing at age seven in 1992 and won the PAL tournament 2005 at 125 lbs, at the National Golden Gloves 2002 on points to Lorenzo Reynolds in the finals and had to settle for 2nd. In 2005, Dargan became US champion but lost twice to Anthony Peterson at the Olympic team trials. In 2007, Dargan was upset by young Javier Molina at the US championships but rebounded to win the Pan American Games in Rio de Janeiro against local Myke Carvalho in the semi and Jonathan Gonzalez of Puerto Rico in the light welterweight final at the Riocentro Sports Complex (9:4). After failing to qualify for the 2008 Olympic Trials, Dargan finished his career as an amateur, and turned professional.

World Amateur Championship
2005
Defeated Carl Heild (Bahamas) RSCO
Lost to Serik Sapiyev (Kazakhstan) 26-37

Pro
Dargan made his pro debut in 2007 and is 19-1 as of November 2018. Dargan was being trained by his uncle, Naazim Richardson.

Personal life
In October 2014, Dargan married American entertainer Lil' Mo (whose real name is Cynthia Loving). Dargan appeared occasionally alongside Loving on the reality television show R&B Divas: Los Angeles during the show's second and third seasons in 2014 and 2015. The couple had a child, a son Karl Dargan Jr. on August 28, 2015. Since October 2017, Dargan has appeared as a supporting cast member on the reality television show Love & Hip Hop: New York. In November 2017, Dargan and Loving appeared on Couples Court with the Cutlers.

References

1985 births
Living people
Light-welterweight boxers
Boxers from Philadelphia
Boxers at the 2007 Pan American Games
Winners of the United States Championship for amateur boxers
American male boxers
Pan American Games gold medalists for the United States
Pan American Games medalists in boxing
Medalists at the 2007 Pan American Games